Mount Baker Secondary School is the only public high school in Cranbrook, British Columbia, Canada. It is part of School District 5 Southeast Kootenay. Mount Baker Secondary School accommodates approximately 900 Grade 10 - 12 students and is the largest high school in the district. Mount Baker offers a large variety of courses,  academic programs, and AAAA and AAA Athletics.

References

External links

School reports - Ministry of Education
 Class Size
 Satisfaction Survey
 School Performance
 Skills Assessment

High schools in British Columbia
Cranbrook, British Columbia
Educational institutions in Canada with year of establishment missing